Wheeling Community Consolidated School District 21 (CCSD21) is a school district headquartered in Wheeling, Illinois in the Chicago metropolitan area. It serves most of Wheeling and surrounding communities, such as Buffalo Grove, Arlington Heights, Mount Prospect and Prospect Heights. As of 2006, there are ten elementary schools in the district and three middle schools. District 21 feeds secondary schools within Township High School District 214, such as Buffalo Grove High School and Wheeling High School.

Schools

 Figures are current as of 2020

Elected Officials

 Phil Pritzker, Board President 
 Staci Allen, Board Vice President 
 Debbi McAtee, Board Secretary 
 Arlen Gould, Member 
 Bill Harrison, Member 
 Stacy Hipsack Goetz, Member 
 Jessica Riddick, Member

References

External links
 Community Consolidated School District 21
 

Arlington Heights, Illinois
Mount Prospect, Illinois
School districts in Cook County, Illinois